Arcidens is a genus of freshwater mussels, aquatic bivalve molluscs in the family Unionidae, the river mussels.

Species
Species within the genus Arcidens include:
 Arcidens confragosus
 Arcidens wheeleri

References

Unionidae
Bivalve genera